Why Beauty Is Truth: A History of Symmetry is a 2007 book by Ian Stewart.

Overview
Following the life and work of famous mathematicians from antiquity to the present, Stewart traces mathematics' developing handling of the concept of symmetry. One of the first takeaways, established in the preface of this book, is that it dispels the idea of the origins of symmetry in geometry, as is often the first context in which the term is introduced. This book, through its chapters, establishes its origins in algebra, more specifically group theory.

Contents 
The topics covered are:

 Chapter 1: The Scribes of Babylon
 The earliest records of solving quadratic equations.
 Chapter 2: The Household Name
 Euclid's influence on geometry in general and on regular polygons in particular.
 Chapter 3: The Persian Poet
 Omar Khayyám's solution to the cubic equation, which makes use of conic sections.
 Chapter 4: The Gambling Scholar
 Niccolò Fontana Tartaglia found the first algebraic solutions to special cubic equations.
 Gerolamo Cardano used algebra to solve the cubic and quartic equation.
 Chapter 5: The Cunning Fox
 Carl Friedrich Gauss proved that the regular 17-gon can be constructed using only compass and straightedge, and extended the field of real numbers to the complex numbers.
 Chapter 6: The Frustrated Doctor and the Sickly Genius
 Joseph Louis Lagrange understood that all approaches to solve algebraic equations could be understood as symmetry transformations of such equations.
 Alexandre-Théophile Vandermonde used symmetric functions as an ansatz to solve general algebraic equations, which would lead to the development of Galois theory.
 Paolo Ruffini developed a first (incomplete) proof that the quintic equation cannot be solved analytically.
 Niels Abel formalized group theory, the indispensable tool in describing symmetries.
 Chapter 7: The Luckless Revolutionary
 Évariste Galois laid the foundations to what is today known as Galois theory.
 Chapter 8: The Mediocre Engineer and the Transcendent Professor
 Pierre Laurent Wantzel proved that it is impossible to double the cube, trisect the angle, and constructing a regular polygon using only compass and straightedge.
 Ferdinand von Lindemann proved the transcendence of pi, and by implication that it is impossible to square the circle using only compass and straightedge.
 Chapter 9: The Drunken Vandal
 William Rowan Hamilton extended the field of complex numbers to the quaternions.
 Chapter 10: The Would-Be Soldier and the Weakly Bookworm
 Marius Sophus Lie formalized Lie groups and Lie algebras.
 Wilhelm Killing classified all simple Lie algebras (in what Ian Stewart calls the "greatest mathematical paper of all time")
 Chapter 11: The Clerk from the Patent Office
 Albert Einstein developed in his theory of general relativity a symmetry of space and time.
 Chapter 12: A Quantum Quintet
 Max Planck, Erwin Schrödinger, Werner Heisenberg, Paul Dirac, Eugene Wigner were major contributors to the early development of Quantum Mechanics. Wigner introduced symmetries into quantum physics.
 Chapter 13: The Five-Dimensional Man
 An overview of attempts to unify the fundamental forces, and the role of symmetry in that endeavor.
 Chapter 14: The Political Journalist
 Edward Witten and Superstring theory
 Chapter 15: A Muddle of Mathematicians
 Here, connections between field extensions of real numbers (complex numbers, quaternions, octonions), the exceptional simple Lie algebras detected by Killing (G2, F4, E6, E7, and E8), and symmetries occurring in string theory are explored.
 Chapter 16: Seekers after Truth and Beauty
 Closes the book by contemplating the role of mathematics in physical research.

Review

—Plus Magazine

References 

Books by Ian Stewart (mathematician)
2007 non-fiction books
Mathematics books